Inverbervie (from  or Biorbhaigh, "mouth of the River Bervie") is a small town on the north-east coast of Scotland, south of Stonehaven.

Etymology 
The name Inverbervie involves the Gaelic Inbhir Biorbhaigh, meaning "mouth of Bervie Water". Historic forms, such as Haberberui from 1290, demonstrate that Gaelic inbhir, "estuary", has succeeded the original Brittonic element aber, with the same meaning (c.f. Welsh aber).

History

Inverbervie appears in written history at least as far back as the 12th century AD; in a document relating to Arbroath Abbey, Simon of Inverbervie is noted as having witnessed a charter transferring the lands of Balfeith to the Abbey. The settlement was formerly a royal burgh from 1342 to 1975 and a parliamentary burgh from 1708 to 1950, the former status being conferred by David II of Scotland for hospitality he and his Queen received when shipwrecked there the previous year when returning from exile. The burgh council was based at Inverbervie Town House which was rebuilt in 1840.

A small harbour in the town was important in early years but despite improvements by Thomas Telford in 1819, disappeared by 1830 owing to the buildup of the shingle bar at the river mouth.
The first flax spinning mill in Scotland was established here at the Haughs around 1790 and by 1910 there were nine in operation employing 500-600 workers. As a result of this, the population of the settlement peaked at over 2,500 around the turn of the 20th century but has since declined owing the downturn in that industry.

The town was within the county of Kincardineshire until 1975, when the county was merged into the Grampian Region. The Aberdeenshire unitary council area, which now includes Inverbervie, was created when the region system was eradicated in 1996. Aberdeenshire is also the name of another former county which was merged into the Grampian Region in 1975.

Prominent local buildings include Hallgreen Castle, founded in 1376, standing on a bluff overlooking the sea towards the southern end of the town.

Climate
Like most of the United Kingdom, Inverbervie has an oceanic climate (Köppen: Cfb). with warm summers, cool winters and few extremes of temperature.

Parliamentary burgh

The parliamentary burgh which existed from 1708 to 1950 was a component of the Aberdeen district of burghs of the Parliament of Great Britain from 1708 to 1801 and of the Parliament of the United Kingdom from 1801 to 1832.

In 1832 Inverbervie became a component of the Montrose district of burghs.

In 1950 it was merged into the North Angus and Mearns constituency. North Angus and Mearns was replaced with new constituencies in 1983.
With effect from the 2011 Scottish Parliamentary elections, Inverbervie will be back within the Mearns and Angus constituency, following boundary changes.

Attractions
Inverbervie has The Bervie Chipper which in 1998 was awarded the title Fish & Chip Shop of the Year 1997. The Bervie Sports Centre opened in March 1989.

Media
 The local newspaper is the Mearns Leader which is published by Johnson Press and edited in the neighbouring town of Stonehaven.
 Bervie is served by local radio station, Mearns FM. Broadcasting from nearby Stonehaven in the Townhall, Mearns FM aims to keep Bervie up to date with local and charity events, as well as playing music. Staffed completely by volunteers, Mearns FM is run as a not for profit organisation, broadcasting under a community radio licence, with a remit to provide local focus news events and programming. Jointly funded by local adverts and local and national grants, it has one of the largest listening areas of any community radio station owing to the Mearns' distributed population. The station was set up to try to bring these distant communities together.

Education
 Bervie Primary School serves Bervie and the surrounding rural area.
 Mackie Academy in Stonehaven.

Community groups

Bervie contains many prominent community groups:

Bervie Church

Bervie Church is part of Arbuthnott, Bervie and Kinneff Church. It is on the main street in close proximity to the school. The parish also owns the Church Centre (formerly the manse) next to the church, and the Herd Centre (formerly YWCA Hall) at the bottom of Town Head. In 2010, the Rev. Dennis Rose became the minister, and he served the congregation until June 2016. In March 2019, the Rev Andrew Morrison became the minister. He is currently the third youngest minister in the denomination.

Scouting and Guiding

Bervie has an active Scout group based in their church street hut. Scouts (10.5-14), Cubs (8-10.5), and Beavers (6-8) are all held. Bervie is part of the Kincardineshire Scout District.

There are Guides (10-14yrs) and Rainbows (5-7yrs) who also hold meetings in the Scout Hall.

The Brownies (7-10yrs) hold meetings in the Burgh Hall.

The Living Rooms

The Living Rooms Christian Centre and Coffee Shop is in the school car park behind the church. The Living Rooms is an evangelical centre which aims to reach out to people. The Coffee Shop is a popular centre of the community. Services of worship are held in the centre as well as prayer meetings, a youth group, and other special events.

Gala and fireworks

Every year the Gala Committee organise the climax of the community diary in June.  As part of this event, a 'citizen of the year' and 'young citizen of the year' prizes are awarded. The fireworks display is organised and held by the caravan site every year on the Sunday nearest to Bonfire Night.

Transport
Inverbervie has regular bus links to Stonehaven, Montrose, Aberdeen and Perth via the X7 Coastrider route. It was served by Bervie railway station, the terminus of a branch line from Montrose, from 1865 to 1951, with freight services discontinued in 1966.

Notable residents
 Hercules Linton, designer of the Cutty Sark clipper ship

See also
 List of burghs in Scotland
 Aber and Inver as place-name elements
 Allardice Castle
 Arbuthnott, Bervie & Kinneff Parish Church

References

 
Towns in Aberdeenshire
Burghs